Elephantinae is a subfamily of mammals in the family Elephantidae and includes the largest existing land animals. Three species are currently recognised: the African bush elephant, the African forest elephant, and the Asian elephant. Elephantidae is the only surviving family of the order Proboscidea; extinct members include the mastodons. The family Elephantidae also contains several now-extinct groups, including the mammoths and straight-tusked elephants. African elephants have larger ears and concave backs, whereas Asian elephants have smaller ears, and convex or level backs. Distinctive features of all elephants include a long trunk, tusks, large ear flaps, massive legs, and tough but sensitive skin. The trunk, also called a proboscis, is used for breathing, bringing food and water to the mouth, and grasping objects. Tusks, which are derived from the incisor teeth, serve both as weapons and as tools for moving objects and digging. The large ear flaps assist in maintaining a constant body temperature as well as in communication. The pillar-like legs carry their great weight.

Elephants may be listed or indexed by many criteria, including taxonomy, status as endangered species, their geographical location, and their portrayal and/or naming in human culture.

Classification

Scientific classification of Elephantidae taxa embraces an extensive record of fossil specimens, over millions of years, some of which existed until the end of the last ice age. Some species like the woolly mammoth were extirpated more recently. The discovery of new specimens and proposed cladistics have resulted in systematic revisions of the family and related proboscideans.

Elephantids are classified informally as the elephant family, or in a paleobiological context as elephants and mammoths. The common name elephant primarily refers to the living taxa, the modern elephants, but may also refer to a variety of extinct species, both within this family and in others. Other members of the Elephantidae, especially members of Mammuthus, are referred to by the common name mammoth.

The family diverged from a common ancestor of the mastodons of Mammutidae. The classification of proboscideans is unstable and has been frequently revised.

The following cladogram shows the placement of the genus Mammuthus among other proboscideans, based on hyoid characteristics:

The systematics of the living subspecies and species of the modern elephants has undergone several revisions. A list of the extant Elephantidae includes:

Elephantidae
Loxodonta (African)
L. africana African bush elephant
L. a. pharaoensis North African elephant†
L. cyclotis African forest elephant

Elephas (Asiatic)
E. maximus Asian elephant
E. m. maximus Sri Lankan elephant
E. m. indicus Indian elephant
E. m. sumatranus Sumatran elephant
E. m. borneensis Borneo elephant
E. m. sondaicus Javan elephant†
E. m. asurus Syrian elephant†

Evolutionary history

Although the fossil evidence is uncertain, by comparing genes, scientists have discovered evidence that elephantids and other proboscideans share a distant ancestry with Sirenia (sea cows) and Hyracoidea (hyraxes). 
These have been assigned, along with the extinct demostylians and embrithopods, to the clade Paenungulata. In the distant past, members of the various hyrax families grew to large sizes, and the common ancestor of all three modern families is thought to have been some kind of amphibious hyracoid. One hypothesis is that these animals spent most of their time under water, using their trunks like snorkels for breathing.

In the past, a much wider variety of genera and species was found, including the mammoths and stegodons.

See also

 Deinotherium
 Embrithopoda
 Eritherium azzouzorum
 Mammut borsoni
 Palaeoloxodon namadicus

References

External links
 
 

Extant Pliocene first appearances
Proboscideans
Taxa named by John Edward Gray
Mammal subfamilies
Elephants